Statistics of the 2000–01 Saudi Premier League.

Stadia and locations

Regular season

Final four

Semifinals

First legs

Second legs

Final

External links 
 RSSSF Stats
 Saudi Arabia Football Federation
 Saudi League Statistics

Saudi Premier League seasons
Saudi Professional League
1